The ICMS Education System is a chain of schools and colleges in Khyber Pakhtunkhwa, Pakistan. 

It was founded in 2005 by Tajamul Hayat. It operates more than 10 educational institutes in the province.

Schooling system
ICMS has an extensive schooling system from nursery up to grade 10th. It has 4 branches in Peshawar District, 3 in Peshawar city and 1 in chamkani . The institute stake holders are planning for expansion to other cities of Khyber Pakhtunkhwa like Nowshera, Islamabad and Dubai.

References

External links
ICMS website

2005 establishments in Pakistan
School systems in Pakistan